Ephenidine (also known as NEDPA and EPE) is a dissociative anesthetic that has been sold online as a designer drug. It is illegal in some countries as a structural isomer of the banned opioid drug lefetamine, but has been sold in countries where it is not yet banned.

Pharmacology

Pharmacodynamics
Ephenidine and related diarylethylamines have been studied in vitro as treatments for neurotoxic injuries, and are antagonists of the NMDA receptor (Ki = 66.4 nM for ephenidine). Ephenidine also possesses weaker affinity for dopamine and norepinephrine transporters (379 nM and 841 nM, respectively) as well as σ1R (629 nM) and σ2R (722 nM) binding sites.

Pharmacokinetics

Metabolism
Ephenidine's metabolic pathway consists of N-oxidation, N-dealkylation, mono- and bis-hydroxylation of the benzene ring, and hydroxylation of the phenyl ring only after N-dealkylation. The dihydroxy metabolites were conjugated by methylation of one hydroxy group, and hydroxy metabolites by glucuronidation or sulfation.

Chemistry
Ephenidine reacts with reagent testing kits to give a semi-unique array of colors which can be used to aid its identification.

Society and culture
Sweden's public health agency suggested that ephenidine be classified as a hazardous substance on 1 June, 2015. Due to that suggestion, ephenidine became a scheduled substance, in Sweden, as of 18 August, 2015.

In Canada, MT-45 and its analogues were made Schedule I controlled substances. Possession without legal authority can result in maximum 7 years imprisonment. Further, Health Canada amended the Food and Drug Regulations in May, 2016, to classify AH-7921 as a restricted drug. Only those with a law enforcement agency, a person with an exemption permit, or institutions with Minister's authorization may possess the drug.

See also 
 AD-1211
 βk-Ephenidine
 Diphenidine
 Fluorolintane
 Lanicemine
 Methoxphenidine (MXP)
 MT-45
 NPDPA
 Remacemide
 UWA-001

References 

Designer drugs
Diarylethylamines
Dissociative drugs
Norepinephrine–dopamine reuptake inhibitors
NMDA receptor antagonists
Sigma receptor ligands